Owen White is a bioinformatician and director of the Institute For Genome Sciences at the University of Maryland School of Medicine. He is known for his work on the bioinformatics tools GLIMMER and MUMmer.

Education
White studied biotechnology at the University of Massachusetts Amherst, gaining a bachelor of science degree in 1985. He later studied with Christopher A. Fields at New Mexico State University, gaining his PhD in molecular biology in 1992.

Research
From 1992 to 1994, White was a postdoctoral fellow in the Genome Informatics department at The Institute for Genomic Research (TIGR) in Rockville, Maryland. This was followed by a period as a collaborative investigator in the Department of Bioinformatics at TIGR.  While at TIGR, White was one of the developers of the GLIMMER (Gene Locator and Interpolated Markov ModelER) gene discovery algorithm, alongside Steven Salzberg and colleagues. Salzberg and White were also involved in the development of the MUMmer software for sequence alignment.

White became director of bioinformatics at TIGR in 2000. He has also been involved in the National Institutes of Health Human Microbiome Project, where he was principal investigator of the Data Analysis and Coordination Center for the first phase of the project.

Awards and honors
In 2015, White was awarded the Benjamin Franklin Award in Bioinformatics for his promotion of free and open-access materials and methods in the life sciences.

References

Living people
American bioinformaticians
Year of birth missing (living people)